Flavobacterium anhuiense  is a Gram-negative bacterium from the genus of Flavobacterium which has been isolated from soil from the Anhui Province in China.

References

 

anhuiense
Bacteria described in 2008